A repertoire is a list or set of dramas, operas, musical compositions or roles which a company or person is prepared to perform.

Musicians often have a musical repertoire. The first known use of the word repertoire was in 1847. This word, in turn, has its origin in the Late Latin word repertorium.

The concept of a basic repertoire has been extended to refer to groups which focus mainly on performing standard works, as in repertory theater or repertoire ballet.

See also 

 setlist – a list of works for a specific performance
 playlist – a list of works available to play
 signature song – a musical composition most associated with a performer

References

Theatre
Singing